Archyala opulenta is a species of moth of the family Tineidae. This species is endemic to New Zealand has been found in the upper Maitai Valley in Nelson as well as in Northland. The larvae of this species are associated with endemic bat species as they feed on the guano of Mystacinidae. The adult moths are on the wing in November. It is classified as "Data Deficient" under the New Zealand Threat Classification System by the Department of Conservation.

Taxonomy 
This species was described by Alfred Philpott in 1926 from specimens collected in the upper Maitai Valley in Nelson by E. S. Gourlay in November. George Hudson in 1928 discussed this species as a synonym of A. terranea. However, in 1927 Philpott had shown a diagnostic difference between these two species when he illustrated the male genitalia of A. opulenta.  The holotype specimen is held at the New Zealand Arthropod Collection.

Description 
Philpott described this species as follows:

Distribution 

It is endemic to New Zealand. This species has been found in Nelson and Northland.

Biology and ecology 
This species was first collected in the bush. This species is a known associate of bat colonies as its larva feeds on the guano of Mystacinidae. The adult moth is on the wing in November.

Conservation status
This moth is classified under the New Zealand Threat Classification system as being Data Deficient.

References

Moths described in 1926
Tineidae
Moths of New Zealand
Endemic fauna of New Zealand
Taxa named by Alfred Philpott
Endemic moths of New Zealand